All the Stations is a documentary series published on YouTube, which sees Geoff Marshall and Vicki Pipe visit all 2,563 stations on Great Britain's National Rail rail network, and all 198 stations in Ireland, on the railway networks of Iarnród Éireann in the Ireland and Northern Ireland Railways in Northern Ireland. The journey across Great Britain took fourteen weeks and six days, starting at Penzance station on 7 May 2017 and finishing at Wick station on 19 August.

All videos are hosted on YouTube. An 80-minute documentary, which has additional content, along with interviews, was released on 19 May 2018.

Funding
All the Stations was crowdfunded via Kickstarter, raising a total of £38,654 in 40 days (from 15 February to 27 March 2017) for the Great Britain series in 2017, and £26,350 for the Ireland series in 2019. Every contributor who donated £10 or more to the Kickstarter campaign was able to adopt a station, and their name appeared on the map on the project's website.

For travelling in Great Britain, Marshall and Pipe used All Line Rover tickets. The money raised from the crowdfunding allowed four main documentary episodes to be published each week on YouTube – there were 59 episodes in total – and also paid for 11 'bonus' episodes. Marshall also hosted further content on his channel, and there was one longer video episode paid for by sponsorship from The Trainline.

Method
The rules set out before the trip were that all 2,563 stations on the National Rail network in Great Britain were to be visited (i.e. every station which appears on the Office of Rail and Road's website).

To visit a station, they had to be on a train that stopped at the station, but they did not have to alight from the train. In the case of request stops, the train had to be scheduled to stop if required; for a number of request stops, they used other transport to get to the station and then requested the train to stop (hence the title of the first episode "Make Your Intent Clear", referring to the instructions given to passengers using request stops).

It was estimated that if they had been required to get off the train at every station, the journey would have taken almost a year to complete.

Stations opened subsequently
After they had visited all 2,563 stations, Kenilworth station was scheduled to open on 10 December 2017, on which day Marshall and Pipe visited the station, although it did not actually open until April 2018. Corfe Castle and Maghull North later became stations numbers 2,565 and 2,566. The pair visited Corfe in August 2018, and Kenilworth and Maghull on 21 December 2018. Originally planned to open on 20 May 2019, Meridian Water opened on 3 June 2019, replacing the nearby Angel Road, which had closed on 31 May. Marshall and Pipe visited Meridian Water on the day it opened, catching the first train to call at the station.

In July 2019, Great Western started a Saturday-only service from Taunton to Bishops Lydeard on the West Somerset Railway, for a limited period of time. Marshall and Pipe visited the station on 3 August, the only day that trains were also scheduled to stop at Norton Fitzwarren.

In June 2020, the All the Stations Twitter account confirmed which newly opened stations they have yet to visit: Warrington West, Robroyston, Worcestershire Parkway, and Horden. Other stations have subsequently been opened.

In April 2022, Marshall completed a series titled Six Stations on his own channel, where he stopped at all six unvisited station and was joined by a different guest at each station. The series began on 4 April at Worcestershire Parkway, then continued to Bow Street, Warrington West, Horden, Robroyston, and concluded at Kintore with a posting on 21 April.

In May 2022, Marshall posted on his personal channel to confirm he and Pipe had separated and she would no longer appear in his transport videos. In June, Marshall posted videos of his visits, with guests, to the new Elizabeth line stations that opened that month; of those, Tottenham Court Road, Canary Wharf, Custom House, and Woolwich were new to the National Rail network. In July, Marshall made a solo visit to the newly opened Barking Riverside, followed by a visit to Reston a couple of days later.

Book
A book about the project, The Railway Adventures, authored by Marshall and Pipe, was released on 16 October 2018 by September Publishing.

Episode list
This list of station visits and corresponding episodes has been compiled from the map on the All the Stations website.

Great Britain

Ireland

All The Stations – Ireland, a project to visit all 198 stations on the island of Ireland, launched its Kickstarter on 6 January 2019 at 6pm; and raised the required £14,500 for this project to go ahead in just 54 minutes. The project got under way on 25 March 2019, starting at Rosslare Europort railway station, and was estimated to take approximately two weeks. The final station, was visited on 10 April 2019.

Isle of Man

All The Stations – Isle of Man was a bonus project to visit all the stations on the Isle of Man. The project was funded from the funds raised as part of All The Stations – Ireland. The project took three days, between 12 July 2019 and 14 July 2019, and covered the Isle of Man Railway on the first day, the Manx Electric Railway and Snaefell Mountain Railway on the second day, and then the Great Laxey Mine Railway and Groudle Glen Railway on the third day. They were unable to ride the Douglas Bay Horse Tramway due to resurfacing works on the seafront promenade.

The precise number of stations visited as part of 'All The Stations – Isle of Man' is uncertain due to the large number of unmarked halts on the Manx Electric Railway; it is probably between 87 and 90.

Notes

References

External links
 All the Stations YouTube channel
 List of all the main and bonus videos on the All the Stations website

2017 British television series debuts
2019 British television series endings
2010s British documentary television series
Travel web series
2010s YouTube series
British non-fiction web series